Osvaldo Cabral (born June 4, 1985 in Clorinda, Argentina) is an Argentine footballer currently playing for Rionegro Águilas of the Primera Division in Colombia.

Teams
  Belgrano de Córdoba (2003–2004)
  Huracán (2004)
  Defensores de Belgrano (2005–2006)
  Rubio Ñú (2007–2013)
  2 de Mayo (2013)
  Rionegro Águilas (2013–2015)
  C.D. Capiatá (2016)
  Macará (2017)
  General Díaz (2018-2019)
  Victoria (2019)
  C.A. River Plate (2020)
  12 de Octubre (2021)
  Juan Aurich (2022)

External links
 
 

1985 births
Living people
Argentine footballers
Argentine expatriate footballers
Club Atlético Belgrano footballers
Defensores de Belgrano footballers
Club Atlético Huracán footballers
Club Rubio Ñu footballers
River Plate (Asunción) footballers
Expatriate footballers in Paraguay
Águilas Doradas Rionegro players
Association football goalkeepers
People from Clorinda, Formosa